The American Association for State and Local History (AASLH) is a non-profit association for state and local history, with a primary focus on history professionals, history volunteers, museums, historical societies, and other history-related organizations and public history professionals. Since 1964, it is headquartered in Nashville, TN, and currently has about 3,200 institutional members, 1,300 individual members, and 34 academic program members. The organization has 11 full-time staff members.

History
In 1904, the American Historical Association, itself at the time a fledgling professional body, established the semi-autonomous Conference of State and Local Historical Societies to serve the leaders of those agencies. In 1939, a group of Conference members, chaired by Christopher C. Crittenden, director of the North Carolina Department of Archives and History,  proposed the creation of an independent entity. Its job would be to better coordinate the activities of historical societies and stimulate the writing and teaching of state and local history in North America. On December 27, 1940, the Conference of State and Local History met and disbanded itself. Then the American Association for State and Local History was born. Its first charter stated that AASLH's purpose was, simply, “the promotion of effort and activity in the fields of state, provincial, and local history in the United States and Canada.”

 1904: American Historical Association establishes Conference of State and Local Historical Societies
 1940: Conference of State and Local Historical Societies seceded from the American Historical Association. The mission was "the promotion of effort and activity in the fields of state, provincial, and local history in the United States and Canada."
 1940: Began publishing books
 1945: Establishment of awards program
 1968: Began publishing Technical Leaflets
 2002: Adopted statement of professional standards and ethics
 2005: Began developing STEPS program
 2009: "Dispatch" became an all-digital publication
 2010: Launched STEPS program

Publications
AASLH publishes a quarterly magazine called History News. A series of instructional articles called Technical Leaflets are published quarterly and distributed with History News. AASLH also publishes books through Rowman & Littlefield Publishing Group including Nomenclature 4.0,Small Museum Toolkit, and the Interpreting History series.

STEPS (Standards and Excellence Program for History Organizations) 
In 2009 AASLH launched the "Standards and Excellence Program for History Organizations," or STEPS. This program helps small- and mid-sized history museums, historic sites and houses, including all-volunteer ones, assess policies and practices, manage daily operations and plan for the future. As opposed to a certification program, STEPS is a self-study program without a set timeline. Participating organizations use a workbook to assess and improve operations. They achieve certificates from AASLH after completing sections. As of 2021, over 1,100 organizations have participated.

Advocacy 
AASLH sponsors, advocates, and lobbies on behalf of state and local history at the national level through strategic partnerships with several organizations. In 1998, it began its American Indian Museums Program (AIMP) to advocate for and provide professional development to America's tribal museums. In 2004, it spearheaded a movement advocating for a new federal program within the Institute of Museum and Library Services’ Office of Museum Studies to provide grants to states to facilitate statewide support for museums, with funds granted to states, where states would then re-grant funds to museums depending upon each state's needs.

Awards 
AASLH awards Certificates of Merit to individuals and organizations to recognize their outstanding contributions to local history and genealogy, such as those awarded to the East Tennessee Historical Society, New Brunswick Genealogical Society and Heinz History Center.

Conferences 
AASLH began holding an Annual Meeting in 1941. Today, the association has two conferences: the in-person Annual Conference and the online Virtual Conference.

See also
 Local history: United States
 American urban history
 American Alliance of Museums
 Association of Art Museum Directors

References

External links 
 

Professional associations based in the United States
Museum associations and consortia
Museum-related professional associations
Local history
Organizations based in Nashville, Tennessee